Kenan Harkin (born June 13, 1974) is an American former professional BMX rider and television personality for NBC, FOX Sports, FUEL TV, ESPN, CBS Sports and Universal Sports. Harkin is credited with being the second rider to successfully and consistently perform a 360 backflip in freestyle BMX competition. Currently, Harkin is a commentator for BMX and other extreme sports events; he was NBC's on-air talent for men's and women's BMX events at the 2008 Summer Olympics. He also was a lifestyle reporter and snowboard analyst for Universal Sports during the 2010 Winter Olympics in Vancouver, British Columbia, Canada.

Harkin operates a reptile sanctuary, Kamp Kenan, and provides educational content on his YouTube channel by the same name. His sanctuary holds many different species of turtles and tortoises, as well as some lizards and snakes. He runs his sanctuary on both personal funds and his online Patreon page where users can donate money and ask Harkin questions.

BMX career
Harkin began racing BMX at the age of 9. By 14, he had begun to concentrate more on style than speed, as he began to popularize what is now referred to as freestyle BMX in shows for small, local audiences across the country. The transition from racer to showman involved several injuries for Harkin, breaking his collarbone, leg, and pinkie finger, and being knocked out cold twice.

At age 20, Harkin met Jay Miron and Matt Hoffman, He helped them while they were touring on Long Island. The duo invited Harkin to the world-famous Woodward Camp. Once at Woodward, Harkin's riding excelled and he began experimenting with the camps newly built foam pits. In 1996 he began working on the 360 backflip, a trick that had only been performed by one other rider, English BMXer Zack Shaw. Harkin was the first rider to use the foam pits to take a trick from inception, to competition. He pulled the trick for the first time in competition at the Chelsea Piers B3 event aired on ESPN. He turned pro at that event and subsequently went into larger competitions. Performing his 360 backflip at these events gained him a great deal of attention and sponsorship, as BMX and other extreme sports entered the mainstream.

Television career
Harkin is known as a color commentator and sideline reporter for numerous events, having worked at the Rockstar US Open, the Gravity Games, the Dew Tour, the Vans Triple Crown series, and the BMX events at the 2008 Summer Olympics. Harkin is also known for being the host of the Gear Guy'd segments on Universal Sports.

Reptile conservation

Harkin is a lifelong reptile enthusiast and expert. He lives in South Florida where he maintains a working reptile sanctuary/breeding facility called Kamp Kenan. He operates a website, KampKenan.com, where he sells his captive-raised animals and also provides education content on his YouTube channel. Harkin works with the Turtle Survival Alliance and stewards many endangered turtle and tortoise species for them. His goal is to create assurance colonies for these species. Harkin also works with crocodilians, venomous snakes, and Cyclura iguanas. He gives educational seminars/presentations all over South Florida, bringing some of the animals from his sanctuary. The goal is to inform the public about the plight of the world's reptiles and to help overcome any prejudices people may have of them. Harkin films for wildlife programs in and around Florida.

References

External links
Kamp Kenan Website

1974 births
Living people
BMX riders
Cycling announcers
People from Long Island
American male cyclists